Karaoğlak is a village in the Kozluk District, Batman Province, Turkey. Its population is 432 (2021).

The hamlet of Merce is attached to the village.

References

Villages in Kozluk District

Kurdish settlements in Batman Province